Aliyah Dunn (born 19 October 1999) is a New Zealand netball international. Dunn was a prominent member of the Central Pulse teams that won the 2019, 2020 and 2022 ANZ Premiership titles. She was also a fringe member of the 2017 Southern Steel team that won the inaugural ANZ Premiership title. Dunn was also a member of the New Zealand teams that won the 2017 Netball World Youth Cup and the 2018 Fast5 Netball World Series. Between 2015 and 2017, Dunn also represented the New Zealand women's national basketball team at under-17 and under-19 (Junior Tall Ferns) levels. In 2022 she played for Tokomanawa Queens in the new Tauihi Basketball Aotearoa league.

Early life, family and education
Dunn was born and raised in Invercargill. She is of Māori and Samoan descent. She is a distant cousin of Te Amo Amaru-Tibble. They had never met before becoming 2021 Central Pulse team mates. However, they found out they are related through Dunn's Southland-based grandmother, who was originally a Tibble with Ngāti Porou family connections. Dunn also has Whakatōhea, Ngāti Kahungunu ki Wairarapa and Te Whānau-ā-Apanui affiliations. Both of Dunn's parents played representative basketball for Southland. Her father, Terrence, also played for Southland Sharks. Aliyah's four siblings have all played basketball at a representative level. In her youth, Dunn played both representative netball and basketball. She attended Te Wharekura o Arowhenua and Verdon College.

Netball

Playing career

Southern Steel
Dunn was a fringe member of the 2017 Southern Steel team, making two appearances as Steel won the inaugural ANZ Premiership title. She began the season playing for Netball South, Southern Steel's reserve team, in the Beko Netball League. On 30 April she made her ANZ Premiership debut for Steel in a 66–46 win against Northern Mystics. Dunn replaced Jhaniele Fowler-Reid with two minutes left in the fourth quarter. On 14 June, after four Steel players were injured in a road traffic accident, Dunn was one of four Netball South players called up to the Steel team for a 51–46 win against Mainland Tactix.

Central Pulse
Ahead of the 2018 season, Dunn signed for Central Pulse. Dunn was subsequently a prominent member of the Pulse teams that won the 2019, 2020 and 2022 ANZ Premiership titles. In 2018 she landed 524 goals from 577 attempts with a 91% accuracy. Only Lenize Potgieter was more accurate. Dunn  finished the 2019, 2020 and 2021 seasons as the most accurate New Zealand shooter in the league with 92%, 91% and 90% returns, respectively. In 2022 Dunn was the ANZ Premiership's leading goal-scorer, landing 618 out of 664 with 93% accuracy. Between 2018 and 2022, Dunn played and scored in four grand finals for Pulse. At the end of the 2022 season, Dunn announced she was leaving Pulse.

Mainland Tactix
Ahead of the 2023 season, Dunn signed for Mainland Tactix.

New Zealand
Dunn was a member of the New Zealand team that won the 2017 Netball World Youth Cup. She made her senior debut for New Zealand on 18 September 2018 against South Africa during the September 2018 Netball Quad Series. In October 2018 she featured for New Zealand in the 2018 Constellation Cup 
and was a member of the Fast5 Ferns team that won the 2018 Fast5 Netball World Series. Despite her impressive scoring stats with Central Pulse and been called up for training squads, Dunn was not included in the 2019 Netball World Cup or 2022 Commonwealth Games squads.

Statistics

Grand finals

ANZ Premiership statistics

|- style="background-color: #eaeaea"
! scope="row" style="text-align:center" | 2017
|style="text-align:center;"|Steel
||| ||  || || || || || || ||2 
|- 
! scope="row" style="text-align:center" | 2018
|style="text-align:center;"|Pulse
|||?||0||0||?||2||2||30||62||16  
|- style="background-color: #eaeaea"
! scope="row" style="text-align:center" | 2019
|style="text-align:center;"|Pulse
|||17||0||0||24||0||8||46||76||16 
|- 
! scope="row" style="text-align:center" | 2020
|style="text-align:center;"|Pulse
|||20||0||0||23||3||6||19||49||14 
|- style="background-color: #eaeaea"
! scope="row" style="text-align:center" | 2021
|style="text-align:center;"|Pulse
|||28||0||0||46||2||10||31||62||15 
|- 
! scope="row" style="text-align:center" | 2022
|style="text-align:center;"|Pulse
|||?||0||0||34||1||12||15||57||16 
|- style="background-color: #eaeaea"
! scope="row" style="text-align:center" | 2023
|style="text-align:center;"|Tactix
||| ||  || || || || || || || 
|- class="sortbottom"
! colspan=2| Career
! 
! 
! 
! 
! 
! 
! 
! 
! 
! 
|}

Basketball

Playing career

New Zealand
Between 2015 and 2017, Dunn represented New Zealand at under-17 and under-19 (Junior Tall Ferns) levels. She was selected to play for the under-17s aged just 15 while attending Verdon College. She subsequently played for New Zealand teams that toured Fiji and China.

Club level
In 2019, Dunn was a member of the Capital Swish team that won Women's Basketball Championship  Division 2 title. After missing out on selection for the New Zealand national netball team for the 2022 Commonwealth Games, Dunn switched codes and signed for Tokomanawa Queens in the new Tauihi Basketball Aotearoa league.

Honours

Netball
New Zealand
Fast5 Netball World Series
Winners: 2018
Netball World Youth Cup
Winners: 2017
Central Pulse
ANZ Premiership
Winners: 2019, 2020, 2022
Runners up: 2017, 2018
Minor premiers: 2018, 2019, 2020, 2022 
Netball New Zealand Super Club
Winners: 2018
Southern Steel
ANZ Premiership
Winners: 2017
Minor premiers: 2017

Basketball
Tokomanawa Queens
Tauihi Basketball Aotearoa
Winners: 2022

References

1999 births
Living people
New Zealand netball players
New Zealand Māori netball players
New Zealand international netball players
New Zealand international Fast5 players
National Netball League (New Zealand) players
ANZ Premiership players
Southern Steel players
Central Pulse players
Mainland Tactix players
New Zealand women's basketball players
Tauihi Basketball Aotearoa players
Power forwards (basketball)
Centers (basketball)
People educated at Verdon College
Sportspeople from Invercargill
New Zealand sportspeople of Samoan descent
Ngāti Porou people
Ngāti Kahungunu people
Whakatōhea people
Te Whānau-ā-Apanui people